The 2003 Pacific hurricane season was the first season to feature no major hurricanes – storms of Category 3 intensity or higher on the Saffir–Simpson hurricane wind scale (SSHWS) – since 1977. The dates conventionally delimiting the period when most tropical cyclones form in the Pacific Ocean are May 15 in the Eastern Pacific Ocean and June 1 in the Central Pacific, with both seasons ending on November 30. The 2003 season featured 16 tropical storms between May 19 and October 26; 7 of these became hurricanes, which was then considered an average season. Damage across the basin reached US$129 million, and 23 people were killed by the storms.

Despite the overall lack of activity, the season produced an unusually large number of tropical cyclones that affected Mexico, with eight tropical cyclones making landfall on either side of Mexico, which was the second highest on record. Tropical Storm Carlos struck Oaxaca in late June, resulting in nine fatalities. In late August, Hurricane Ignacio struck the Baja California Peninsula, killing four people and inflicting US$21 million in damage. In September, Hurricane Marty affected the same areas as Ignacio, and was responsible for 12 casualties and US$100 million in damage, making Marty the costliest and deadliest storm of the season. In October, Hurricanes Olaf and Nora struck western Mexico as tropical depressions, causing slight damage and one casualty.

Activity in the Central Pacific was below average, with only one tropical depression forming in the basin and one hurricane entering the basin from the East Pacific. In mid-August, Hurricane Jimena passed just to the south of Hawaii; it was the first storm to directly threaten Hawaii in several years.

Seasonal forecasts 

On May 16, 2003, the Servicio Meteorológico Nacional (SMN, National Meteorological Service) released their prediction for tropical cyclone activity in the eastern Pacific. A total of 15 named storms, 6 hurricanes, and 2 major hurricanes was forecast. Three later days, National Oceanic and Atmospheric Administration (NOAA) issued its Central Pacific hurricane season forecast, calling for a slightly below-average level of activity due to the expected development of La Niña. La Niña conditions generally restrict tropical cyclone development in the Northeast Pacific, which is the opposite of its effect in the Atlantic. On June 12, 2003, NOAA issued a forecast for the East Pacific hurricane season – the first time it had done so. The scientists expected that La Niña conditions would develop, and predicted a 50 percent chance of below normal activity and a 40 percent chance of near normal activity.

Seasonal summary 

There were 16 named storms and 7 hurricanes during the 2003 Pacific hurricane season, which is comparable with the long-term averages. For the first time since 1977, there were no major hurricanes, where the long-term average is four. (Major hurricanes are storms of Category 3 intensity or higher on the Saffir–Simpson hurricane wind scale.) The first hurricane, Ignacio, formed on August 24. This is the latest formation of the first hurricane of a season recorded in the East Pacific since reliable satellite observation began in 1966. The accumulated cyclone energy (ACE) index for the 2003 Pacific hurricane season, at 53.4 units in the Eastern Pacific and 3.3 units in the Central Pacific, places the season among the top 10 least active seasons since 1971, when reliable records began.

While the total activity was below average, there was an unusually high number of landfalls in Mexico. Eight Pacific and North Atlantic tropical cyclones had a direct impact in Mexico in 2003, second only to 1971, when nine did so. This is well above the long-term average of 4.2 Atlantic and East Pacific storms affecting Mexico. Five Pacific storms impacted Mexico; Hurricanes Ignacio and Marty both made landfall in the state of Baja California Sur at hurricane intensity. Two other storms hit mainland Mexico as tropical storms and a third as a tropical depression. Three storms hit Mexico within a very short space of time: the Pacific hurricanes Nora and Olaf, and the Atlantic Tropical Storm Larry. As a result of the flooding caused by these storms, disaster areas were declared in 14 states.

Activity in the Central Pacific was below average, with only one tropical depression forming in the basin and one hurricane entering the basin from the East Pacific. A third system, Tropical Storm Guillermo, weakened to a remnant low just to the east of the Central Pacific Hurricane Center's area of responsibility. Although activity was generally low, Hurricane Jimena was the first direct threat to the Hawaiian Islands for several years and a hurricane watch was issued for the island of Hawaii. Jimena passed to the south, but still brought tropical-storm-force gusts and heavy rain to the island.

Systems

Tropical Storm Andres 

An area of disturbed weather developed south of Guatemala on May 10 within a broad area of low pressure. While tracking westward, the disturbance became classifiable by the Dvorak technique on May 18. The depression strengthened into Tropical Storm Andres the next day. A further increase in shear, soon followed by a decrease in ocean temperatures, caused Andres to weaken on May 25. It was downgraded to a tropical depression on May 25, became a post-tropical cyclone at 12:00 UTC that day, and dissipated on May 26 without affecting land.

Tropical Storm Blanca 

In mid-June, a tropical wave interacted with a lingering area of disturbed weather near the southwestern Mexican coast. Following an increase in organization, the combined disturbance was classified as a tropical depression at 00:00 UTC on June 17. The storm strengthened and became Tropical Storm Blanca 12 hours later. The storm moved slowly to the west and reached its peak on June 18 with  winds; around this time, the cyclone displayed an eye-like feature on weather satellite. Under the influence of strong shear from the southeast, Blanca began to weaken and move erratically, although intermittent bursts of deep convection continued. The storm degenerated to a tropical depression on June 20 and a post-tropical cyclone by 12:00 UTC on June 22. The remnants of Blanca were tracked for an additional two days. There were no effects from Blanca on land.

Tropical Storm Carlos 

Tropical Storm Carlos formed from a tropical wave that crossed Central America on June 20. After gradually organizing, the wave was designated a tropical depression at 00:00 UTC on June 26 and further upgraded to Tropical Storm Carlos after twelve hours. The system moved generally northward and developed an eye, which was visible on Puerto Ángel radar. The storm rapidly deteriorated to a remnant low by 18:00 UTC on June 27, which persisted until dissipation on June 29.

In northwestern Oaxaca, seven people were killed when the heavy rainfall triggered a mudslide. Mudslides were reported elsewhere in the state, and about 30,000 homes were damaged. Throughout its path, the storm affected about 148,000 people. Monetary damage totaled 86.7 million pesos (2003 MXN, US$8 million). In addition to the seven deaths across Oaxaca, two fishermen were reported missing.

Tropical Storm Dolores 

A tropical wave entered the East Pacific on June 30 and four days later became classifiable by the Dvorak technique while south of Manzanillo, Colima. Convection coalesced around an area of low pressure as it moved west. It soon strengthened further, becoming Tropical Storm Dolores and reaching its peak intensity with winds of  six hours later. This peak was short-lived as an increase in east-northeasterly shear stripped the storm of its convection and caused it weaken back to a tropical depression on July 7. The northwest motion caused by a mid-level ridge north and northeast of the cyclone brought it over colder water, and the system degenerated into a post-tropical remnant low around 06:00 UTC on July 8. Dissipation occurred the next day.

Tropical Storm Enrique 

On July 6, a tropical wave entered the Northeastern Pacific Ocean. An area of low pressure developed and began to show signs of organization on July 9. The storm became more organized and was named Tropical Storm Enrique 24 hours later as it tracked west-northwest. As Enrique strengthened and upper-level outflow expanded in all directions, forecasters briefly anticipated it to become a hurricane. The cyclone instead peaked with winds of  early on July 12, after which point it encountered cool waters at a high latitude. Accordingly, Enrique rapidly weakened despite low wind shear. The storm degenerated into a remnant low around 00:00 UTC on July 14 and continued to move west before dissipating three days later.

Tropical Storm Felicia 

A tropical wave passed over Central America on July 12 and began to show signs of organization south of the Gulf of Tehuantepec two days later, prompting Dvorak classifications on the system. Tracking westward on the southern periphery of a ridge, the depression became Tropical Storm Felicia twelve hours later, and forecasters anticipated further strengthening into a minimal hurricane. However, the storm remained disorganized and peaked with  winds late on July 18. The storm gradually weakened under increasing shear as it headed west, weakening back to a tropical depression on July 20 and degenerating to a remnant low around 12:00 UTC on July 23. After a west-northwestward turn, the remnant low entered the Central Pacific, where it dissipated well east of Hawaii on July 24. Felicia did not impact land.

Tropical Storm Guillermo 

A tropical wave entered the eastern north Pacific Ocean on August 1 and began to show signs of organization three days later, including the development of convection and the formation of a surface low. Although the system was forecast to remain under tropical storm intensity and ultimately dissipate, it became more organized as it moved to the west. At 00:00 UTC on August 8, the depression was upgraded to Tropical Storm Guillermo. Later that day, Guillermo reached its peak strength with  winds. Guillermo weakened into a tropical depression on August 11, and it became further disheveled as wind shear increased from the west. Associated deep convection collapsed on August 12, and Guillermo degenerated to a remnant low around 18:00 UTC. The remnant low entered the Central Pacific and interacted with another weak low-level circulation that would later become Tropical Depression One-C prior to dissipation on August 13.

Tropical Storm Hilda 

On August 5, a tropical wave south of the Gulf of Tehuantepec began to produce persistent thunderstorm activity. Owing to the system's impressive outflow across its western quadrant, forecasters predicted additional intensification to hurricane strength. Hilda moved west-northwest initially, but increasingly cooler waters weakened the cyclone, and low-level flow across the East Pacific turned the storm west. It dissipated on August 13 having never approached land.

Tropical Depression One-C 

In mid-August, an area of active weather formed within the monsoon trough southeast of the Hawaiian Islands. At 18:00 UTC on August 15, this disturbance organized into Tropical Depression One-C. The incipient cyclone moved west and faced strong wind shear owing to a large upper-level trough to its northeast. The system remained south of both the Hawaiian Islands and Johnston Atoll and eventually crossed into the West Pacific basin on August 20.

Hurricane Ignacio 

A tropical wave spawned a distinct area of disturbed weather just south of Manzanillo on August 20. Under the influence of favorable atmospheric conditions, the cyclone steadily strengthened and obtained tropical storm status on August 23. Early on August 24, Ignacio attained hurricane strength, marking the latest formation of the first hurricane of a season recorded in the East Pacific since reliable satellite observation began in 1966. The storm tracked northwest across the southern Gulf of California and began to weaken due to land interaction, ultimately making landfall with winds of  just to the east of La Paz. Ignacio weakened once inland and dissipated early on August 28 over central Baja California.

The passage of the hurricane left citizens in Todos Santos without power for around 24 hours. It forced the closure of roads and airports in La Paz. Overall, Ignacio was responsible for approximately US$21 million in damage. Four people were killed by the storm, including two rescue workers that drowned in the flood waters brought by the storm, and some 10,000 people were evacuated to shelters. Six municipalities in Baja California Sur were declared disaster areas. The remnants of Ignacio produced thunderstorm activity in high terrain areas of central California, resulting in 3,500 customers losing power, over 300 lightning strikes, and 14 forest fires.

Hurricane Jimena 

The storm began to steadily intensify as it tracked over warm ocean waters, attaining tropical storm status six hours later. Shortly after developing an eye, Jimena was upgraded into a hurricane on August 29. The storm moved to the west, entering the Central Pacific as it continued to strengthen. Further weakening brought the cyclone back to tropical depression intensity on September 3. It crossed the International Date Line before dissipating on September 5.

Forecasters at the Central Pacific Hurricane Center issued a hurricane watch for the Big Island on August 31 at 00:00 UTC. The storm brought  of rain and  surf to the island of Hawaii, resulting in minor flooding on the eastern side of the Big Island. Wind gusts reached , which knocked down trees and damaged power lines, resulting in 1,300 residents without electricity.

Tropical Storm Kevin 

A tropical wave entered the East Pacific on August 21 but remained devoid of any convective activity until August 28. A broad surface low developed on August 29 but its associated convective activity remained poorly organized. Tracking west-northwest around the western periphery of a ridge over Mexico, the disturbance began receiving Dvorak classifications on September 3. After formation, the system was inhibited by its broad circulation and its positioning near cooler waters. Nevertheless, the depression reached tropical storm strength on September 4, and Kevin attained peak winds of  then. This peak intensity lasted for just six hours as the cyclone weakened back to a tropical depression. At 06:00 UTC on September 6, the system degenerated to a remnant low, which persisted for four days before dissipation. Tropical Storm Kevin did not impact land.

Hurricane Linda 

A tropical wave entered the East Pacific on September 6. Convection began to increase along its axis on September 9; three days later, a broad surface low developed. The cyclone moved to the northwest and was classified as a tropical storm at 12:00 UTC on September 14. Linda steadily intensified as rainbands increased and outflow expanded. After 12 hours at this intensity, the cyclone began to weaken, turning west and then southwest as it did so. Linda became a tropical depression on September 17 and degenerated to a remnant low around 00:00 UTC the next day. It persisted for a few days before dissipation on September 23. Linda did not affect land.

Hurricane Marty 

A tropical wave moved into the East Pacific on September 10, and the convection associated with it gradually increased. High pressure to its west facilitated Marty's development, while favorable conditions allowed it to become a Category 2 hurricane with peak winds of  early on September 22. After moving over the southern tip of the peninsula, Marty moved up the western coast of the Gulf of California, gradually weakening as it did so. The storm weakened to a tropical storm on September 23 and a tropical depression later that day. After making a second landfall near Puerto Peñasco as a tropical depression around 18:00 UTC on September 24, the system degenerated to a remnant low six hours later. Its remnants meandered over the northern Gulf of California prior to dissipating two days later.

Hurricane Marty was the deadliest storm of the 2003 Pacific hurricane season and was responsible for 12 deaths. A  storm surge flooded parts of La Paz, and sank 35 yachts moored in various ports. Five people drowned after their cars were swept away by floodwaters while trying to cross a flooded stream. The floods also damaged about 4,000 homes. Two deaths also occurred when a tree fell on a car in Sinaloa. Overall, 6,000 people were affected and total damage from the storm was estimated at US$100 million, making Marty the costliest East Pacific storm of the year. The outer bands of the cyclone brought dropped locally heavy rains to extreme southwestern Arizona, but there were no reports of flooding.

Hurricane Nora 

A tropical wave moved over Central America on September 25 and tracked parallel to the Mexican coast. It became more organized on October 1 and developed into Tropical Depression Fourteen-E roughly  the south of the Baja California Peninsula around 18:00 UTC. The system continued to strengthen as it moved northwest in favorable conditions, becoming Tropical Storm Nora 12 hours later. On October 4, it became a hurricane and reached its peak as a Category 2 hurricane with  winds. The influence of a mid-level trough, in conjunction with outflow from Hurricane Olaf, caused Nora to veer sharply eastward and begin to rapidly weaken. Nora dissipated over land six hours later. Moisture from the remnants of Nora and Olaf interacted with an upper-level low to produce heavy rainfall across Texas, causing flooding near Waco that forced a family to evacuate.

Hurricane Olaf 

The depression strengthened into Tropical Storm Olaf six hours after forming as it moved to the northwest in a low shear environment. Olaf reached its peak strength as a minimal hurricane with  winds around 12:00 UTC on October 5 as it developed a partial eyewall. The storm soon became disorganized and was only a hurricane for six hours as increased wind shear took its toll on the cyclone. The system weakened as it moved inland, falling to tropical depression intensity late on October 7 and dissipating early the next day.

Since Olaf struck the Mexico coastline as a more coherent system than Nora, it produced significantly more rainfall across the region, resulting in severe flooding in the states of Jalisco and Guanajuato. These rains damaged crops, roads, and over 12,000 houses. One fatality was reported.

Hurricane Patricia 

The final storm of the 2003 season began as a tropical wave that crossed Central America on October 17. Six hours later, it intensified into Tropical Storm Patricia while paralleling the Mexico coastline well offshore. As banding features increased in association with the cyclone, and as it developed an eye, Patricia became the season's final hurricane around 12:00 UTC on October 21. It peaked with winds of  twelve hours later, despite predictions of a much stronger storm. On October 22, the cyclone encountered wind shear associated with an upper-level trough near Baja California, and its circulation quickly became displaced from associated thunderstorm activity. It fell below hurricane strength that day but fluctuated in intensity through October 25. Early that day, Patricia weakened to a tropical depression, and by 06:00 UTC on October 26, it degenerated to a remnant low. The low turned west and dissipated twelve hours later.

Other systems
On January 11, the JTWC began monitoring the disturbance that would eventually develop into Yanyan near the International Date Line.

Storm names 
The following list was used to name storms that formed in the Northeast Pacific in 2003. Names that were not assigned are marked in gray as unused. No names were retired by the World Meteorological Organization, therefore this list was used again in the 2009 season. The same list was used for the 1997 season except for Patricia, which replaced Pauline.

For storms that form in the Central Pacific Hurricane Center's area of responsibility (between 140°W and the International Date Line), names are used in a series of four rotating lists.

Season effects 
The table of storms that formed in the 2003 Pacific hurricane season includes their duration, names, intensities, areas affected, damages, and death totals. Damage and deaths include totals while the storm was extratropical, a wave, or a low.

See also 

 Tropical cyclones in 2003
 List of Pacific hurricanes
 Pacific hurricane season
 2003 Atlantic hurricane season
 2003 Pacific typhoon season
 2003 North Indian Ocean cyclone season
 South-West Indian Ocean cyclone seasons: 2002–03, 2003–04
 Australian region cyclone seasons: 2002–03, 2003–04
 South Pacific cyclone seasons: 2002–03, 2003–04

Notes

References

External links 

 National Hurricane Center Website
 National Hurricane Center's Eastern Pacific Tropical Weather Outlook
 Servicio Meteorológico Nacional Website 
 NHC's 2003 tropical cyclone advisory archive
 WPC's 2003 Tropical Cyclone Rainfall Pages
 Central Pacific Hurricane Center's 2003 season summary
 Mariners Weather Log: Summary of the 2003 Pacific hurricane season

 
Pacific hurricane seasons
2003 EPac